is a train station in Hyōgo-ku, Kobe, Hyōgo Prefecture, Japan.

Lines
Kobe Municipal Subway
Kaigan Line Station K08

Stations of Kobe Municipal Subway
Railway stations in Hyōgo Prefecture
Railway stations in Japan opened in 2001